Billbergia magnifica is a species of flowering plant in the genus Billbergia. This species is native to Brazil and Paraguay.

References

magnifica
Flora of Brazil
Flora of Paraguay
Flora of the Atlantic Forest
Plants described in 1903